Hydrotaea albipuncta is a fly from the family Muscidae. It is found in the Palearctic.

References

External links
D'Assis Fonseca, E.C.M, 1968 Diptera Cyclorrhapha Calyptrata: Muscidae Handbooks for the Identification of British Insects pdf
Seguy, E. (1923) Diptères Anthomyides. Paris: Éditions Faune de France Faune n° 6 393 p., 813 fig.Bibliotheque Virtuelle Numerique  pdf

Muscidae
Muscomorph flies of Europe
Insects described in 1845
Taxa named by Johan Wilhelm Zetterstedt